Jenny Spain (born July 2, 1980, in San Diego, California) is an American actress of Spanish descent. Her mother is a singer and her father is a mechanical engineer.

In 2007, Spain appeared in her first short film All The Girls Fake, which won an award at East Lansing Film Festival. She played the title role in the 2008 movie Deadgirl.

Filmography
 All The Fake Girls (2007 short film)
 Deadgirl (2008)
 Trust (2010)
Harvest (2011 short film)
American Girls (2013)

References

External links
 
 Jenny Spain on Myspace

1980 births
American film actresses
Actresses from San Diego
Living people
American people of Spanish descent
21st-century American women